Zubovići may refer to:

Zubovići, Foča, village in the Foča municipality, Bosnia and Herzegovina
Zubovići, Goražde, village in the Goražde municipality, Bosnia and Herzegovina
Zubovići u Oglečevi, village in the Goražde municipality, Bosnia and Herzegovina
Zubovići, Croatia, village in the Novalja municipality, Croatia